The women's foil was one of eight fencing events on the fencing at the 1980 Summer Olympics programme. It was the eleventh appearance of the event. The competition was held from 23 to 24 July 1980. 33 fencers from 14 nations competed.

Results

Round 1

Round 1 Pool A

Round 1 Pool B

Round 1 Pool C

Round 1 Pool D

Round 1 Pool E

Round 1 Pool F

Round 2

Round 2 Pool A

Round 2 Pool B

Round 2 Pool C

Round 2 Pool D

Double elimination rounds

Winners brackets

Winners group 1

Winners group 2

Winners group 3

Winners group 4

Losers brackets

Losers group 1

Losers group 2

Final round

Final classification

References

Foil women
1980 in women's fencing
Fen